Ross Millington (born 19 September 1989) is a British long-distance runner.

He represented Great Britain at the 2016 Summer Olympics in Rio de Janeiro, in the men's 10,000 metres.

In 2019, he competed in the senior men's race at the 2019 IAAF World Cross Country Championships held in Aarhus, Denmark. He finished in 64th place.

References

External links

1989 births
Living people
British male long-distance runners
English male long-distance runners
British male cross country runners
English male cross country runners
Olympic male long-distance runners
Olympic athletes of Great Britain
Athletes (track and field) at the 2016 Summer Olympics
British Athletics Championships winners